The Wild Puffalumps is a 22-minute direct-to-video animated cartoon, based on the Puffalump toy line of the same name. It was produced by Nelvana, and released on videocassette in the United States by Family Home Entertainment in 1988 and in Canada by Cineplex Odeon and MCA.

This cartoon was intended to act as an advertisement for the “Wild Puffalumps” toy line, which consisted of vividly-colored Puffalumps wearing Aloha shirts and sunglasses whose lenses displayed the word “WILD” when seen at the proper angle. The glasses were large enough that the children who owned the toys could wear them, a fact which was pointed out in the television commercial for the toys.

In the cartoon, the characters all live on an island separate from the rest of the world, much like many other 1980s toy-based cartoon characters (Care Bears, My Little Pony, etc.). The two children who visit this place soon find themselves going on a journey, parts of which are like amusement park rides, and the word “wild” is repeatedly emphasized throughout the cartoon. All of this is intended to make the characters fit in with the current cartoon culture, as well as give the impression that the toys on which they're based are fun and exciting.

The VHS videocassette has been currently out of print since the end of the 1980s, and the cartoon was never released on DVD. The Wild Puffalumps toys were sold in 1987 and discontinued the same year.

In 2016, the cartoon was uploaded on YouTube.

Voice cast
As listed in closing credits:
 Tara Charandoff as Holly
 Marlow Vella as Kevin
 Jennifer Gula as Elephant
 Mairon Bennett as Toucan
 Noam Zylberman as Tiger
 Victor Erdos as Walrus
 Adam Simpson as Rhino
 Lisa Coristine as Monkey
 Tara Meyer as Panda

References

External links
 
 

1988 films
1988 animated films
1988 direct-to-video films
1980s animated short films
Films based on toys
1980s toys
Direct-to-video animated films
Canadian animated short films
Nelvana films
Canadian direct-to-video films
1980s children's animated films
1980s Canadian films